Cale J. Bradford is the Chief Judge of the Indiana Court of Appeals. He was appointed to the Court's Second District on August 1, 2007 by Governor Mitch Daniels. He was selected to be Chief Judge on January 1, 2020.

Prior to his service on the Court of Appeals, Bradford served as a judge of the Marion County Superior Court. He was elected on January 1, 1997 and was the presiding judge for the 2005–2006 term, as well as being the juvenile division chair.

Bradford earned a B.S. at Indiana University Bloomington in 1982 and a J.D. at the Indiana University Robert H. McKinney School of Law in 1986.

Controversy
In a child custody case, Judge Bradford approved a ruling of a magistrate forbidding either parent from instructing their son in their shared religious beliefs. The magistrate questioned how Wicca differed from Satanism and required the parents to shelter their child from "non-mainstream religious beliefs and rituals". This ruling was overturned on appeal.

References

External links
Marion County Superior Court Profile
 Bradford Appointed Appeals Judge

Indiana state court judges
Living people
Year of birth missing (living people)
People from Marion County, Indiana
Indiana University Robert H. McKinney School of Law alumni